Son of Aladdin is a 2003 Indian animated film based on the life of the Aladdin written and directed by Singeetam Srinivasa Rao. Produced by Pentamedia Graphics, the film had 1100 shots and 125 characters. The film won Special Mention in the Competition section at the 2003 International Children’s Film Festival Hyderabad, and was subsequently premiered at the 37th International Film Festival of India. In 2016, the film was released as Mustafa & the Magician in  Los Angeles and was submitted for consideration for the Academy Award for Best Animated Feature.

See also
List of Indian animated feature films

References

External links

2003 films
Animated feature films
Animated musical films
Films about wish fulfillment
Films set in Asia
Genies in film
Indian animated fantasy films
2000s musical fantasy films
Films directed by Singeetam Srinivasa Rao
Films based on Aladdin
English-language Indian films
Indian computer-animated films
Indian musical fantasy films
2000s English-language films